Mugdock Country Park is a country park and historical site located partly in East Dunbartonshire and partly in Stirling, in the former county of Stirlingshire, Scotland.

The park includes the remains of the 14th-century Mugdock Castle, stronghold of the Grahams of Montrose, and the ruins of the 19th century Craigend Castle, a Gothic Revival mansion and former zoo. The park has a moot hill and gallowhill, historical reminders of the baronial feudal right, held by lairds, of "pit and gallows". Also located in the park are the remains of numerous anti-aircraft trenches, which were established during World War II as part of the Clyde Basin anti-aircraft defense system.

The park was also the home of the Mugstock Music Festival, at which performers have included Emma Pollock, Dodgy and Beats Antique.

Natural features include the Allander Water, Mugdock Loch and Drumclog Muir, all of which provide popular walking and cycling routes with tourists. Visitor facilities include a visitor centre and cafe in the former Craigend Castle stable block, and a garden centre and restaurant in the walled garden. 

The park is served by the Mugdock and East Dunbartonshire Countryside Ranger Service.

The West Highland Way, a linear long distance footpath between Milngavie and Fort William, passes through the outer areas of the park alongside the local Clyde Coastal Path.

Close again to the country park is Milngavie water treatment works, another popular walking and tourist attraction. It is situated just south of Mugdock and connects to the park via Drumclog Moor.

References

External links
 Clyde Coastal Path website
 Mugdock Country Park
	
 Mugdock Country Park on Canmore, Historic Environment Scotland.
 Video footage of the Moot Hill, Gallows Knowe and Drowning Pit

See also
List of places in East Dunbartonshire
List of places in Scotland

Country parks in Scotland
Parks in Stirling (council area)
Protected areas of East Dunbartonshire
Milngavie